Udon Thani Rajabhat University (UDRU)  is a university in Udon Thani, northeast Thailand. It confers associate, bachelors, masters, and doctoral degrees.

Timeline
 1923: School founded as the "Teacher Training School in Agriculture Udon Thani".
 1930: Its name was changed to "Teacher Training School" (men-only initially).
 1958: Name changed to "Udon Thani Teachers' Training School".
 1960: Upgraded in status to "Udon Thani Teachers' College".
 1975: Following passage of the "Teachers' College Act", Udon Thani Teachers' College was permitted to offer bachelor's degrees.
 1992: King Bhumibol Adulyadej granted the name "Rajabhat Institute" ("Rajabhat" means "people of the king") to teachers' colleges nationwide.
 2003: In 2003 the "Rajabhat University Act" was passed.
 2004:  Udon Thani Rajabhat Institute assumed university status on 15 June and adopted the new name "Udon Thani Rajabhat University".

Campuses

The university has three campuses:
 Main Campus Udon Thani
 Bueng Kan Campus
 Sam Phrao Campus

Faculties
 Faculty of Education
 Faculty of Humanities and Social Science
 Faculty of Science
 Faculty of Management Science
 Faculty of Technology
 Faculty of Nursing

Ranking
In July 2013, the university was ranked 65th best in Thailand by Webometrics.

See also
Rajabhat University system

References

Rajabhat University system
Universities in Thailand
Educational institutions established in 1923
1923 establishments in Siam